The Schuyler family (/ˈskaɪlər/; Dutch pronunciation:  [sxœylər]) was a prominent Dutch family in New York and New Jersey in the 18th and 19th centuries, whose descendants played a critical role in the formation of the United States (especially New York City and northern New Jersey), in leading government and business in North America and served as leaders in business, military, politics, and society. The other two most influential New York dynasties of the 18th and 19th centuries were the Livingston family and the Clinton family.

History
By 1650, Philip Pieterse Schuyler emigrated to New Netherland, settling in Beverwyck. His brother, David Pieterse Schuyler, also emigrated from The Dutch Republic.

The Schuyler family ancestry and ties were factors in several major American families, including the Livingston family, the Oyster Bay branch of the Roosevelt family, the Bayard family, the Bush family and the Kean family, among others. Descendants also exist in some noble families in the United Kingdom (including the Gage family, the Kennedy family, the Bertie family, and the Fitzroy family, among others).

Family tree

Philip Pieterse Schuyler line
 Pieter Tjercks (patronymic, not a family name) (–1656) m. Geertruyt Philips van Schuylder (1603–1651)
 Philip Pieterse Schuyler (1628–1683) m. Margarita Van Slichtenhorst (1627–1710)
 Geertruy Schuyler (b. 1654) m. Stephanus van Cortlandt (1643–1700)
 Margaretta van Cortlandt m. 1696: Judge Samuel Bayard (b. 1669), son of Nicholas Bayard, Mayor of New York
 Gertrude Bayard m. Peter Kemble (1704–1789), a prominent New Jersey businessman and politician
 Margaret Kemble (1734–1824) m. Thomas Gage (1718/19–1787), General of the British Army during the American Revolutionary War. Descendants of this union are found in England, including amongst the Viscounts Gage and the noble Bertie family in England (including those holding the title of Earl of Abingdon).
 Anne van Cortlandt (1676–1724) m. Stephen DeLancey (1663–1741)
 James DeLancey (1703–1760), New York Governor
 Susannah de Lancey (1707–1771) m. Vice-Admiral Sir Peter Warren (1703–1752)
 Oliver De Lancey Sr. (1718–1785) m. Phila Franks, daughter of Abigail Franks and member of prominent Jewish colonial family.
 Anne de Lancey (b. 1723) m. John Watts, ancestors of the Marquess of Ailsa in Scotland, the Duke of Grafton and the Viscount Daventry in England.
 Catherine van Cortlandt m. Andrew Johnston (1694–1762), a New Jersey politician and son of John Johnstone, the 32nd Mayor of New York City.
 Elizabeth van Cortlandt m. Reverend William Skinner
 Lt. General William Skinner, a Loyalist
 Brig. Gen. Cortlandt Skinner (1727–1799), a Loyalist m. Elizabeth Kearney (1731–1810)
 Philip van Cortlandt (1683–1746) m. Catherine De Peyster
 Pierre van Cortlandt (1721–1814), the 1st Lieutenant Governor of New York m. Joanna Livingston (granddaughter of Robert Livingston)
 Philip van Cortlandt (1749–1831)
 Pierre van Cortlandt, Jr. (1762–1848)
 Alida Schuyler (b. 1656) m. (1) 1675: Nicholas van Rensselaer (1636–1678); m. (2) 1679: Robert Livingston the Elder (1654–1728)
Johannes Livingston (1680–1720)
Margaret Livingston (b. 1681)
Joanna Philipina Livingston (1683–1689)
Philip Livingston (1686–1749) m. Catherine Van Brugh
Robert Livingston (1708–1790) m. (1) 1731: Maria Thong (granddaughter of Gov. Rip Van Dam); m. (2) 1766: Gertrude ( Van Rensselaer) Schuyler.
 Walter Livingston (1740–1797) m. Cornelia Schuyler (1746–1822), his cousin
 Henry Walter Livingston (1768–1810) m. 1796: Mary Allen
 Peter Van Brugh Livingston (1712–1792) m. Mary Alexander, sister of William Alexander, Lord Stirling
 Philip Livingston (1717–1778) m. 1740: Christina Ten Broeck
 Sarah Livingston (1752–1814) m. John Henry Livingston (1746–1825), her second cousin
 Robert Livingston (1688–1775) m. Margaret Howarden (1693–1758)
 Hubertus ("Gilbert") Livingston (b. 1690) m. Cornelia Beekman, granddaughter of Wilhelmus Beekman
 William Livingston (1692–1692), died young.
 Joanna Livingston (b. 1694)
 Catherine Livingston (1698–1699), died young.
 Pieter Schuyler (1657–1724), first mayor of Albany m. (1) Engeltie Van Schaick (died 1689), m. (2) Maria Van Rensselaer, the daughter of Jeremias Van Rensselaer
 Margarita Schuyler (b. 1682) m. Robert Livingston (1663–1725), nephew of Robert Livingston the Elder
 Angelica Livingston (b. 1698) m. Johannes Van Rensselaer (1708–1793), son of Hendrick van Rensselaer
 Catherine Van Rensselaer (1734–1803)  m. Philip Schuyler (1733–1804) (see below)
 Jeremiah van Rensselaer (1738–1810) m. (1) Judith Bayard (1740–1817), great-granddaughter of Nicholas Bayard; m. (2) Helena Lansing (1743–1795)
 Johannes Jeremiah Van Rensselaer (1762–1828) m. Catharina Glen (1765–1807)
 Robert Van Rensselaer (1740–1802) m. Cornelia Rutsen (1747–1790)
 Jacob R. Van Rensselaer (1767–1835), who married Cornelia de Peyster.
Hendrick I. van Rensselaer (1742–1813)
 James van Rensselaer (1747–1827)
 Gertruj Schuyler (b. 1694) m. Johannes Lansing
 Col. Phillipus Schuyler (b. 1696) m. Margarita Schuyler
 Pieter Schuyler (b. 1698), a twin of Jeremiah m. Catherine Groesbeck.
 Pieter P. Schuyler (1723–1753) m. Geertruy "Gertrude" Schuyler (1724–1813), his cousin
 Cornelia Schuyler (1746–1822) m. Walter Livingston (1740–1797)
 Pieter P. Schuyler, Jr. (1748–1792) m. Geertruy "Gertrude" Lansing (b. 1748/9)
 Stephen Schuyler (1732–1798) m. Engeltje Van Vechten (1732–1792)
 John Schuyler (1768–1843) m. Anna Cuyler m. Maria Miller (1784–1832)
 Angelica Schuyler (1820–1896) m. Clarkson Floyd Crosby (1817–1858)
 John Schuyler Crosby (1839–1914) m. Harriet Van Rensselaer (1838–1911)
 Jeremiah Schuyler (1768–1843) m. 1793: Jane Cuyler (1770–1832) 
 Cornelius Schuyler (1795–1876) m. 1817: Harriett L. Hillhouse (1798–1857)
 Philip P. Schuyler (1736–1808) m. Anna Wendell (1743–1802)
 Catharina Schuyler (1766–1820) m. Abraham Van Vechten (1762–1837)
 Jeremias Schuyler (1698–1753), a twin of Pieter m. Susanna Bayeux
 Brandt Schuyler (1659–1752) m. Cornelia Van Cortlandt (1659–1722)
 Arent Schuyler (1662–1730) m. (1) Jannetje Teller, m. (2) Swantje Van Duyckhuysen (1679–1720), m. (3) Maria Walter
 Margareta Schuyler (b. 1685)
 Philip Schuyler (b. 1687) m. Hester Kingsland
 Maria Schuyler (b. 1689), died young
 Olivia Schuyler
 Judik Schuyler (b. 1692)
 Casparus Schuyler (1695–1754) m. Mary Schuyler
 Arent Schuyler m. 1748: Jannetje Van Wagenen
 Wilhemus Schuyler (b. 1700), died young
 Peter Schuyler (1707–1762) m. (1) Hester Walter, m. (2) Mary Walter
 Katherine Schuyler (1737–1765) m. Archibald Kennedy, 11th Earl of Cassilis (1736–1794)
 Eva Schuyler (d. 1737) m. Peter Bayard
 Adonijah "Adonis" Schuyler (1708–1763) m. Gertrude Van Rensselaer (b. 1714), daughter of Kiliaen Van Rensselaer
 John Schuyler (1710–1773) m. Anne Van Rensselaer (b. 1719), daughter of Kiliaen Van Rensselaer
 Elsey Schuyler Heminover (1760–1848) m. Anthony Heminover (1750/1824), Patriot Soldier From Moravia
 Mary Schuyler Roosevelt (b.1762) m. Johannes Roosevelt (1751/1820), Great uncle to Theodore
 Cornelia Schuyler (1715–1785) m. Pierre Guillaume DePeyster (1707–1785)
 Arent Schuyler DePeyster (1736–1822), British military officer
 Philipse "Philip" Schuyler (1666–1724) m. (1) 1687: Elizabeth De Meyer; m. (2) 1719: Catherine Schierph (widow of Ritsert Brouwer)
 Nicholas Schuyler (1691–1748) m. (1) 1714: Elsie Wendell (1689–1744); m. (2) 1744: Mary Stevenson
 Ariaantie Schuyler (1720–1763) m. Kiliaen van Rensselaer (1717–1781)
 Killian K. Van Rensselaer (1763–1845) m. 1791: Margaret Sanders (1764–1830)
 Harmanus Schuyler (1727–1796) m. Christina ten Broeck
 John Harmanus Schuyler (1763–1846) m. Annatje Schuyler (1770-1851)
 George W. Schuyler (1810–1888) m. Matilda Scribner
 Eugene Schuyler (1840–1890)
 Walter S. Schuyler (1850–1932)
 Johannes Schuyler (1668–1747) m. 1695: Elizabeth Staats (d. 1737)

 Philip Johannes Schuyler (d. 1745), killed during the French and Indian raid on Saratoga on November 28, 1745. 
 Johannes Schuyler Jr. (1697–1741) m. Cornelia van Cortlandt (1698–1762), (daughter of Stephanus Van Cortlandt his first cousin)
 Geertruy "Gertrude" Schuyler (1724–1813) m. (1) Pieter P. Schuyler (1723–1753), her cousin; m. (2) John Cochran (1730–1807)
 James Cochran (1769–1848) m. Catherine Van Rensselaer Schuyler (1781–1857), his first cousin
 Cortlandt Schuyler (1735-1773) m. (1) Francis Fox
 Stephanus Schuyler (1737-1820) m. (1) Lena Ten Eyck (1745-1818)
 Stephen Van Rensselaer m. Mary De Bright
 Cortlandt Van Rensselaer (1820-1879) m. Salina Sarah Smith
 Cortlandt Ten Eyck (1856-1909) m. Anne Fanning Carroll
  Gen. Philip Schuyler (1733–1804) m. Catherine Van Rensselaer (1734–1803) (see above)
 Angelica Schuyler (1756–1814) m. John Barker Church (1748–1818)
  Philip Schuyler Church m. Anna Matilda Stewart, daughter of Walter Stewart 
 Elizabeth Schuyler (1757–1854) m. Alexander Hamilton (1755/7–1804), the first Secretary of the United States Treasury, and the Senior Officer of the United States Army from 1799-1800. 
  Hamilton family
 Margarita "Peggy" Schuyler (1758–1801) m. Stephen Van Rensselaer III (1764–1839)
  Stephen Van Rensselaer IV (1789–1868) m. Harriet Elizabeth Bayard (1799–1875)
 Margaret Schuyler Van Rensselaer (1819–1897) m. (1) John de Peyster Douw (1812–1901) m. (2) Wilmot Johnson (1820–1899)
 Cornelia Patterson Van Rensselaer (1823–1897) m. Nathaniel Thayer, Jr. (1808–1883)
 Stephen Van Rensselaer (1824–1861) m. Annie Louise Wild
 Catherine Van Rensselaer (1827–1909) m. Nathaniel Berry (1811–1865)
 Justine Van Rensselaer (1828–1912) m. Dr. Howard Townsend (1823–1867)
 Bayard Van Rensselaer (1833–1859) m. Laura Reynolds (1830–1912)
 Harriet Van Rensselaer (1838–1911) m. John Schuyler Crosby (1839–1914)
 Eugene Van Rensselaer (1840–1925) m. Sarah Boyd Pendleton (1846–1923)
 John Bradstreet Schuyler (1765–1795) m. Elizabeth Van Rensselaer (1768–1841)
 Philip Jeremiah Schuyler (1768–1835) m. (1) Sarah Rutsen (d. 1805) m. (2) Mary Anna Sawyer
 Philip P. Schuyler (1789–1875) m. Rosanna Livingston
 Stephan Van Rensselaer Schuyler (1792–1859) m. Catherine Morris
 Catherine Schuyler (1793–1875) m. Samuel Jones (1770–1853)
 John Rutsen Schuyler (1796–1875)
 Robert Livingston Schuyler (1798–1855) m. Lucinda Waldron "Lucy" Wood (1807–1882)
 Julia Wood Schuyler m. 1850: Rev. William Orne Lamson (1824–1909)
 George Henry Lamson (1852–1882)
 Robert Schuyler Lamson (1855–1876)
 Robert Sands Schuyler (1830–1895) m. 1864: Caroline E. Acker (1840–1905)
 William Sawyer Schuyler (1840–1864) m. 1859: Florence Miriam Barbour (1840–1895) (niece of Reuben H. Walworth)
 William Schuyler (1807–1829)
 Sybil Schuyler (1809–1813)
 George Lee Schuyler (1811–1890) m. (1) Eliza Hamilton (1811–1863) m. (2) Mary Morris Hamilton (1815–1877)
 Rensselaer Schuyler (1773–1847) m. Elizabeth Ten Broeck, daughter of Abraham Ten Broeck
 Catherine Van Rensselaer Schuyler (1781–1857) m. (1) Samuel Malcolm m. (2) James Cochran (1769–1848), her first cousin
 "Madame" Margarita Schuyler (b. 1701) m. Phillipus Schuyler, her first cousin
 Catalentie Schuyler (b. 1704) m. Mayor Cornelis Cuyler (1697–1765)
 Johannes Cuyler (1729–1749)
 Elizabeth Cuyler (1731–1815) m. 1752: Jacobus Van Cortlandt (1726–1781) (grandson of Jacobus Van Cortlandt)
 Philip Cuyler (b. 1733) m. 1757: Sarah Tweedy (1739–1825)
 Hendrick "Henry" Cuyler (1735–1803), royalist m. 1767: Catharina Lydius (1743–1818)
 Elsje "Elsie" Cuyler (1737–1761) m. 1760: Augustus Van Cortlandt (1728–1823) (grandson of Jacobus Van Cortlandt)
 Margarita Cuyler (1738–1802) m. 1760: Isaac Low (1735–1791), a royalist
 Isaac Low, became a field officer in the British army.
 Helena Low m. Dirck Hansen, operator of the Albany-Greenbush ferry
 Sir Cornelius Cuyler, 1st Baronet (1740–1819) m. 1763: Anne Wendell
 Abraham Cornelius Cuyler (1742–1810) m. 1764: Jannetje "Janet" Glen
 Jacob Glen Cuyler (1773–1854) m. 1808: Maria Elizabeth Hartman
 Margareta Schuyler (1672–1748) m. Jacobus Verplanck (1671–1771)

David Pieterse Schuyler line

 Pieter Tjercks (–1656) m. Geertruyt Philips van Schuylder (1603–1651)
 David Pieterse Schuyler (1636–1690) m. Catharina Verplanck (1639–1690), both died during the Schenectady massacre of 1690
 Myndert Schuyler (1672–1755) m. Rachel Cuyler (1674–1747)
 Anna Schuyler (1697–1750) m. Johannes De Peyster III (1694–1789), Mayor of Albany and son of Johannes de Peyster
 Pieter Davidse Schuyler (b. 1659) m. Alida Van Slictenhorst
 David Pieterse Schuyler (1688–1764) m. Anna Bradt
 Peter David Schuyler (1723–1763) m. Elizabeth Barbara Herkimer 
 Johan Joseph "Hon Yost" Schuyler (1743–1810), militia member and spy during the American Revolution
 Philip David Schuyler (1730–1777) m. Anna
 Maria Schuyler (1666–1742) m. Dr. Hendrick van Dyck (1665–1707)
 David Hendrick Van Dyke (1693–1763) m. Christina Ten Broeck (1694–1750), sister of Dirck Wesselse Ten Broeck (1638–1717)
 Arent Van Dyck (1700–?) m. Heyetie Van Dyck  
 Lydia Van Dyck (1704–1785) m. Cornelius Van Schaack (1705–1776)
 Cornelius Van Schaack Jr. (1734–1797) m. Angeltie (Angelica) Yates; brother of Peter van Schaack
 Maria Helen Van Schaack (1773–1845) m. James Jacobus Roosevelt (1759–1840)
 Cornelius Van Schaack Roosevelt (1794–1871) m. Margaret Barnhill (1799–1861)
 Roosevelt family (Oyster Bay)
 Margaret Schuyler
 Jacobus Schuyler (b. 1675) 
 Catharina Schuyler (b. 1678) m. Johannes Abeel (1667–1711), Mayor of Albany
 Christoffel Abeel (b. 1696) m. Margueritta Breese
 Johannes Abeel (1722–1794) m. Gah-hon-no-neh

 Catalina Abeel (b. 1698) m. Vincent Matthews
 David Mathews (1739–1800), Loyalist Mayor of New York during the American Revolution m. Sarah Seymour
 Catalina Mathews (b. 1759) m. James Lamb, Jr. (b. 1755), a British Lt.
 Sarah Lamb (b. 1777) m. Vice-Admiral James Noble (b. 1779)
 Edith Elizabeth Noble (1811–1875) m. Rev. William Wollaston Pym (1792–1852), son of Francis Pym
 Horatio Noble Pym (1844–1896), British solicitor, book collector and editor
 Harriet Mathews (1763–1847) m. Francis Green (1742–1809)
 Anna Winslow Green m. Samuel Webber (1759–1810), president of Harvard
 Amelia Mathews (d. 1816) m. 1807: John Corbett Ritchie (1775–1860)
 Caroline Maria Ritchie (b. 1808) m. 1830: Edmund Murray Dodd (1797–1876)
 Murray Dodd (1843–1905) m. 1879: Laura Isabel
 Rosina Uniacke Dodd (d. 1899) m. 1872: Henry Arthur Keith-Murray (b. 1846) (son of Sir William Keith-Murray, 7th Baronet)
 Lewis Wilkieson Johnstone (1862–1936), Member of House of Commons of Canada m. Annie Brown
 James Mathews (b. 1742) m. Hannah Strong (b. 1742)
 Juliana Strong Mathews (1775–1830) m. Lazarus Hammond (1777–1848), founder of Hammondsport
 Samuel Haight Hammond (1809–1878) m. Emeline Anne Humphrey (1808–1873), granddaughter of Congressman Reuben Humphrey
 Sarah Mathews (1778–1830) m. General Samuel S. Haight (1778–1863)
 Fletcher Mathews Haight (1799–1866), United States federal judge m. Elizabeth Stuart McLachlan (1799–1827)
 Henry Huntly Haight (1825–1878), tenth Governor of California m. Anna E. Bissell (1834–1898)
 Cornelia Abeel (b. 1701) m. Goose Van Schaick 
 Anthony Van Schaick, Jr. (b. 1721)
 Anna Van Schaick (b. 1754)
 David Abeel (b. 1705)
 Catharina Abeel (b. 1723)

Schuyler Family Association

On 25 March 2020, members of the Schuyler family formed the Schuyler Family Association, with a founding governing board including Charles Neuhauser (chair) and Katherine Rosman.  The association periodically publishes items of interest to the family in a newsletter called Kindred.

See also 
Van Rensselaer family
Van Cortlandt family
Temple Bowdoin
Peter Schuyler (New Jersey soldier)
Schuyler Colfax
Schuyler Copper Mine
Schuyler Island

Notes

 
American families of Dutch ancestry
Political families of the United States
Families from New York (state)
Families from New Jersey